Three-Wheeling Through Africa is an autobiographical book and a best seller written by James Calmar Wilson in 1936 about the first motorcycle trip crossing the continent of Africa.

James Wilson and Francis Flood were sailing around the coast of Africa as Flood was writing travel articles for his newspaper in the United States. On a lark, Wilson talked Flood into traversing the continent on 5 horse-power single-cylinder Triumph motorcycle. They encounter many trials along the way, often resorting to pushing the bikes where the paths were not suitable as they doggedly pursue a route through jungle and desert from Lagos, Nigeria to the Red Sea. Throughout the book Wilson refers to their adventure as the "Flood-Wilson Trans-African Motorcycle Expedition". Later Lowell Thomas encouraged him to write a book. It includes many encounters with tribal people, poisonous snakes and officers and expatriates from England and France in African colonies and outposts. It was briefly reviewed in the Montreal Gazette in 1936.

Only two years prior had any motor vehicle crossed the continent, that was by automobile. Flood and Wilson chose a route that took them above Lake Chad. Flood and Wilson are noted among long-distance motorcycle riders.

List of cities, villages and forts listed in order by Wilson in the book

Bibliography

References 

Motorcycle writing
African travel books
1936 non-fiction books